Auchinhove, located to the east of Keith in Moray, Scotland, is the site of a Roman marching camp, first discovered by aerial photography in 1949.

References

Bibliography
 
 
History of Moray
Archaeological sites in Moray
Roman fortified camps in Scotland